The Lament for Nippur, or the Lament for Nibru, is a Sumerian lament, also known by its incipit tur3 me nun-e ("After the cattle pen..."). It is dated to the Old Babylonian Empire. It is preserved in Penn Museum on tablet CBS13856.

It is one of five known Mesopotamian "city laments"—dirges for ruined cities in the voice of the city's tutelary goddess.

Text
The Lament is composed of 9 kirugu (sections, songs) and 8 gišgigal (antiphons) followed by 3 more kirugu.

Numbered by kirugu, the lament is structured as follows:
storm of Enlil; Enlil destroys Nippur
weeping goddess; Nippur addresses Enlil 
storm of Enlil; Enlil destroys Nippur
weeping goddess; the poet addresses Nippur  
storm of Enlil; Ishme-Dagan recreates Nippur
weeping goddess; the poet addresses Nippur  
storm of Enlil; Ishme-Dagan recreates Nippur
storm of Enlil; Enlil recreates Nippur
storm of Enlil; Ishme-Dagan recreates Nippur
storm of Enlil; Enlil recreates Nippur
storm of Enlil; Ishme-Dagan recreates Nippur
storm of Enlil; Enlil recreates Nippur

It includes passages in the emesal, a sociolect used by high-status women, showing the importance of women's voices in city laments; emesal is also found in the Lament for Ur.

See also
The Lament for Sumer and Ur
The Lament for Ur
The Lament for Eridu
The Lament for Uruk

References

External links
Full text
Full translation (Electronic Text Corpus of Sumerian Literature)

19th-century BC literature
18th-century BC literature
17th-century BC literature
Sumerian texts
First Babylonian Empire
Nippur